Blastobasis catappaella is a moth in the family Blastobasidae. It is found in Kenya. The habitat consists of the coastal areas and 
xeric highlands.

The length of the forewings is 4 mm. The forewings are pale brown intermixed with brown and a few reddish brown and dark brown scales. The hindwings are pale brown, gradually darkening towards the apex.

The larvae feed on the fruit of Terminalia catappa.

Etymology
The species epithet, catappaella is derived from the species name of the host plant.

References

Endemic moths of Kenya
Moths described in 2010
Blastobasis
Moths of Africa